Gabrieli Qoro (born November 22, 1970 in Serua) is a Fijian athlete.  He represented his country in the 1992 Summer Olympics in Barcelona; he was eliminated in the qualification rounds of both the men's long jump and the quarterfinals of the men's 100 meters event.  He has since coached netball in Fiji, and has been active in AIDS outreach in the islands.

References

External links

1970 births
Living people
Fijian male sprinters
Olympic athletes of Fiji
Athletes (track and field) at the 1992 Summer Olympics
I-Taukei Fijian people
Fijian male long jumpers
20th-century Fijian people
21st-century Fijian people